is a Japanese actress and voice actress who is affiliated with Ken Production. Her most known roles include Shimei Ryomou in Ikki Tousen, Tsukuyo in Gintama, Kyō Takamimori in Potemayo, Amane Ootori in Strawberry Panic!, Minako Tsukiyama in Maria-sama ga Miteru, Maeda Matsu in Sengoku Basara, and Isabella in The Promised Neverland.

Filmography

Television animation
2001
Geneshaft (Sofia Galgalim)
Strawberry Eggs (Teacher)
Parappa the Rapper (Receptionist)
Vandread: The Second Stage (Roban)

2002
The Twelve Kingdoms (School Girl 3 (ep 1),Secretary 1 (ep 9), Student girl 2 (ep 4))
Ai Yori Aoshi (Miyuki)
Shrine of the Morning Mist (Girl B (ep 16))
Petite Princess Yucie (Kate (ep 4))
Ghost in the Shell: Stand Alone Complex (Niimi's Secretary (eps 21–22))
Getbackers (High Schoolgirl (ep 27))
Hamtaro (Harmony)

2003
Transformers: Armada (Teacher)
Gunparade March (Librarian)
Stellvia (Girl A (ep 1))
Astro Boy (Tamami)
Texhnolyze (Yoko)
Ikki Tousen (Shimei Ryomou)
Godannar (Shadow)
Saiyuki Reload (Shunto (ep 11))
Fullmetal Alchemist (Leo/Rick's Mother (ep 24))

2004
Daphne in the Brilliant Blue (Yuu Paku)
Maria Watches Over Us (Minako Tsukiyama)
Kurau: Phantom Memory (Ayaka)
Maria Watches Over Us Season 2: Printemps (Minako Tsukiyama)
Tactics (Yumeyakko)
Kujibiki Unbalance (Izumi Tachibana)

2005
Starship Operators (Imari Kamiya)
Jinki:Extend (Aunt Cafeteria)
Best Student Council (Yuuko Kimizuka (ep 9))
Tsubasa: RESERVoir CHRoNiCLE (Souma)
Trinity Blood (Sister Paula)
Onegai My Melody (Kanade Yumeno)
Kamichu! (Student Council Vice President)
Kotenkotenko (Thoth)
Blood+ (Julia Silverstain)
Hamtaro (Harmony)

2006
Digimon Data Squad (Hayase's Wife)
Strawberry Panic! (Amane Ootori)
Glass Fleet (Michel Vaurban de Cabelle)
Hime-sama Goyojin (Miss Yoko)
Ramen Fighter Miki (Hell's Bunny)
Nighthead Genesis (Mayumi (ep 13))
D.Gray-man (Hevlaska)
009-1 (Billy (ep 7))
Hell Girl: Two Mirrors (Utae Negoro (ep 10))

2007
Tokyo Majin (Mamiko Sakuya)
Ikki-Tousen: Dragon Destiny (Shimei Ryomou)
Engage Planet Kiss Dum (Itsuki Sasara)
Princess Resurrection (Liza Wildman)
Emma: A Victorian Romance Second Act (Nanette)
Potemayo (Kyo Takamimori)
Rental Magica (Daphne)
Hero Tales (Rinmei)

2008
Hatenko Yugi (Village Chief's Son)
Kamen no Maid Guy (Saki Tabaruzaka)
Blue Dragon: Trials of the Seven Shadows (Dannel)
Our Home's Fox Deity (Kotoji no Nushi)
Kaiba (Parm)
Golgo 13 (Jean Barbara)
Ikki Tousen: Great Guardians (Shimei Ryomou)
Sekirei (Hikari)
Toradora! (Sumire Kanō)
Hyakko (Ushio Makunouchi)
A Certain Magical Index (Aiho Yomikawa)
Tytania (Sonia)

2009
Gin Tama (Tsukuyo)
Maria Holic (Ryuuken Ishima)
Kurokami The Animation (Mikami Houjou)
Birdy the Mighty Decode:02 (Moss)
Sengoku Basara: Samurai Kings (Matsu)
Asura Cryin' (Toru Kitsutaka)
Queen's Blade: The Exiled Virgin (Listy)
Gokujou!! Mecha Mote Iinchou (Rika Sakashita)
Hanasakeru Seishunen (Brigitte)
Guin Saga (Rigea)
Saki (Jun Inoue)
Eden of the East (Misae)
Taisho Baseball Girls (Tomoe Tsukubae)
Tokyo Magnitude 8.0 (Mari Kusakabe)
Queen's Blade 2: The Evil Eye (Listy)
Asura Cryin' 2 (Tooru Kitsutaka)
A Certain Scientific Railgun (Aiho Yomikawa)

2010
Dance in the Vampire Bund (Vera)
Ikki Tousen: Xtreme Xecutor (Shimei Ryomou)
The Tatami Galaxy (Hanuki-san)
Okami-san & Her Seven Companions (Momoko Kibitsu)
Sekirei: Pure Engagement (Hikari)
Sengoku Basara: Samurai Kings II (Matsu)
A Certain Magical Index II (Aiho Yomikawa)

2011
Bleach (Ikumi Unagiya)
Gosick (Secretary (eps 9–10))
Freezing (Elizabeth Maybury)
Tiger & Bunny (Agnes Joubert)
Maria Holic Alive (Ryuuken Ishima)
Yondemasu yo, Azazel-san (Uriel)
Astarotte's Toy (Ursula Sumarlidi)
Blue Exorcist (Caspar)
Manyo Hiken-chi (Oiso)
Chihayafuru (Yumi Yamamoto)
Persona 4: The Animation (Mayumi Yamano)
Shakugan no Shana III (Shaheru)

2012
Bodacious Space Pirates (Ririka Kato)
Queen's Blade: Rebellion (Risty)
Arashi no Yoru ni: Himitsu no Tomodachi (Lolo)
Saki Episode of Side A (Jun Inoue)
La storia della Arcana Famiglia (Federica)
Code:Breaker (Kanda)

2013
Yondemasuyo, Azazel-san. Z (Yumi, Uriel)
A Certain Scientific Railgun S (Aiho Yomikawa)
Tokyo Ravens (Hishamaru)

2014
Black Bullet (Sumire Muroto)
Black Butler: Book of Circus (Beast)
Broken Blade (Lee)
Mekakucity Actors (Tsubomi Kido)
Date A Live II (Jessica Bayley)
Saki: The Nationals (Jun Inoue)
Sengoku Basara: End of Judgement (Matsu)

2015
JoJo's Bizarre Adventure: Stardust Crusaders Egypt Arc (Malèna (eps 32–33))
Snow White with the Red Hair (Garack Gazelt)
Subete ga F ni Naru (Miki Magata)
The Asterisk War (Kyōko Yatsuzaki)

2016
Snow White with the Red Hair 2nd Season (Garack Gazelt)

2017
Kabukibu! (Kaoru Asagi)
Kado: The Right Answer (Sophie Fukami)

2018
Dances with the Dragons (Nidvolk)
Hugtto! PreCure (Gelos)
Aikatsu Friends! (Reiko Minato)
Senran Kagura Shinovi Master (Naraku)

2019
Dororo (Jorogumo, Ohagi)
The Promised Neverland (Isabella)
One Piece (Belo Betty)
A Certain Scientific Accelerator (Aiho Yomikawa)
YU-NO: A Girl Who Chants Love at the Bound of this World (Grantia)
Special 7: Special Crime Investigation Unit (Akane "Samurai" Shikisai)
Stars Align (Sakura Muroi)
True Cooking Master Boy (Shan)

2020
The God of High School (Ma Mi-Seon)
Food Wars!: Shokugeki no Soma: The Fifth Plate (Tamako Yukihira)
Ikebukuro West Gate Park (Makoto's mother)

2021
True Cooking Master Boy Season 2 (Shan)
Log Horizon: Destruction of the Round Table (Sarariya)
Farewell, My Dear Cramer (Naoko Nōmi)
The Seven Deadly Sins: Dragon's Judgement (Gelda)

2022
Requiem of the Rose King (Jane Shore)
The Executioner and Her Way of Life (Flare)
Birdie Wing: Golf Girls' Story (Seira Amawashi)
Spy × Family (Sylvia Sherwood)
Shin Ikki Tousen (Shimei Ryomou)
The Devil Is a Part-Timer!! (Amane Ōguro)
Tatami Time Machine Blues (Hanuki-san)
Chainsaw Man (Fox Devil)

2023
Campfire Cooking in Another World with My Absurd Skill (Kishar)

Tokusatsu
Ultraman Decker (2022) - Alien Metron Nigel

Original video animation (OVA)
Gunbuster 2: Diebuster (2004), Ruu Soon
Fafner in the Azure: Right of Left (Yumi Ikoma)
Demon Prince Enma (2006), Enma (child)
Shin Kyuseishu Densetsu Hokuto no Ken: Yuria-den (2007), Toh
Master of Martial Hearts (2008), Rei Kakizaki
Mobile Suit Gundam Unicorn (2010), Marida Cruz
The Kubikiri Cycle (2016), Jun Aikawa

Original net animation (ONA)
Hero Mask (2018–19), Sarah Sinclair
Eden (2021), Geneve
Resident Evil: Infinite Darkness (2021), Claire Redfield
The Heike Story (2021), Hōjō Masako
Kakegurui Twin (2022), Sachiko Juraku
JoJo's Bizarre Adventure: Stone Ocean (2022), Miuccia Miuller
Exception (2022), Nina

Film
Nasu: Summer in Andalusia (2003), Woman A
Naruto the Movie: Legend of the Stone of Gelel (2004), Yukie Fujikaze
Resident Evil: Degeneration (2008), Claire Redfield
Oblivion Island: Haruka and the Magic Mirror (2009), Vikki
Wonderful World (2010), Shaki Mikami
Alice in the Country of Hearts: Wonderful Wonder World (2011), Vivaldi
Blood-C: The Last Dark (2012), Haruno Yanagi
Code Geass: Akito the Exiled (2012), Sophie Randle
Gekijkoban Gintama Kanketsu-hen: Yorozuya yo Eien Nare (2013), Tsukuyo
When Marnie Was There (2014), Marnie's mother
Digimon Adventure tri. (2015), Maki Himekawa
The Night Is Short, Walk on Girl (2017), Hanuki-san
Gintama: The Very Final (2021), Tsukuyo

Video games
2003
Juniko Kuki - Guren no Hyou Kyoujin no Michi (Classmate)

2005
Radiata Stories (Frau)
Rumble Roses (Dixie Clemets / Sgt. Clemets)
Sengoku Basara (Matsu)

2006
Suikoden V (Jean)
Blood+: One Night Kiss (Julia)
Sengoku Basara 2 (Matsu)
Carnage Heart Portable (Ellen Deminkofu)
Strawberry Panic! (Amane Otori)
EVE～new generation～ (Kanemoto)
Blood+: Shoyoku no Battle Rondo (Julia)
Armored Core 4 (Bromide Aurieru)

2007
Heart no Kuni no Alice ~Wonderful Wonder World~ (Vivaldi)
Ikkitousen Shining Dragon (Shimei Ryomou)
Phantasy Star Universe (Lia Martinez)
Sengoku Basara 2 Heroes (Matsu)
Everybody's Golf 2 (Brenda)
Final Fantasy IV (Rosa, Barbariccia)
Ace Combat 6: Fires of Liberation (Ludmila Tolstaya)
Clover no Kuni no Alice ~Wonderful Wonder World~ (Vivaldi)

2008
God of War (Persephone)
Asaki, Yumemishi (Mizuki, Senhou)
Mario Kart Wii Female Miis
Soulcalibur IV (Hildegard von Krone)
Phantasy Star Portable (Lia Martinez)
Trauma Center: Under the Knife 2 (Reina Mayuzumi)
Ikkutousen: Eloquent Fist (Shimei Ryomou)

2009
Sengoku Basara Battle Heroes (Matsu)
Toradora! Portable (Sumire Kan)
Gears of War 2 (Maria Santiago)
Taishou Yakyuu Musume. ~Otome-tachi no Seishun Nikki~ (Tomomi Tsukie)
Sekirei: Mirai Kara no Okurimono (Hikaru)
Joker no Kuni no Alice ~Wonderful Wonder World~ (Vivaldi)
Phantasy Star Portable 2 (Lia Martinez)
Queen's Blade Spiral Chaos (Turistico)

2010
Abyss of the Sacrifice (Orange)
Heavy Rain (Madison Paige)
Minna Tennis Portable (Rachel)
Saki Portable (Jun Inoue)
Ikkitousen Xross Impact (Shimei Ryomou)
Sengoku Basara 3 (Matsu)
Fallout: New Vegas (Veronica Sant'Angelo)
The 3rd Birthday (Gabrielle Monsigny)

2011
Mobile Suit Gundam 00 ~Memories of war~ 
Sengoku Basara Chronicles Heroes (Matsu)
Deus Ex: Human Revolution (Fedorova)
To Aru Kagaku no Railgun (Aiho Yomikawa)
Call of Duty:Modern Warfare 3 (A-10 Pilot)

2012
Rhythm Thief & the Emperor’s Treasure (Elisabeth)
Soulcalibur V (Hildegard von Krone)
Dragon Age II (Sunnyall)
Bravely Default: Flying Fairy (Einheria Venus)
Assassin's Creed III: Liberation (Aveline de Grandpre)
PlayStation All-Stars Battle Royale (Nariko)

2013
Tomb Raider (Lara Croft)
Killer is Dead (Vivian Squall)
Conception II: Shichisei no Michibiki to Mazuru no Akumu (Ruby)
Hanasaku Manimani (Seikiku)

2014
Granblue Fantasy (Freesia Von Bismark)
Black Bullet (Sumire Muroto)
Onechanbara Z2: Chaos (Aya)
Mekakucity Actors (Kido Tsubomi)

2015
Bravely Second (Einheria Venus)
Resident Evil: Revelations 2 (Claire Redfield)
Batman: Arkham Knight (Poison Ivy)
Rise of the Tomb Raider (Lara Croft)
Fallout 4 (Dr. Madison Li)

2016
Persona 5 (Sae Niijima)

2017
Fire Emblem Echoes: Shadows of Valentia (Mathilda)
City Shrouded in Shadow (Risa Kashiwagi)

2018
Octopath Traveler (H'aanit)
Shadow of the Tomb Raider (Lara Croft)
SNK Heroines: Tag Team Frenzy (Skullomania)
Onmyoji (Enenra)
Onmyoji Arena (Enenra)
Dissidia Final Fantasy Opera Omnia (Rosa)
Judgment (Saori Shirosaki)

2019
Resident Evil 2 (Claire Redfield)
Astral Chain (Jena Anderson)
AI: The Somnium Files (Boss)
Soulcalibur VI (Hildegard von Krone)

2020
Kandagawa Jet Girls (Naraku Mamiya)
Girls' Frontline (DP-12 & AK-15)
Azur Lane (KMS Mainz)
Arknights (Leizi)
Persona 5 Scramble: The Phantom Strikers (Sae Niijima)

2021
 Lost Judgment (Saori Shirosaki)

2022
The King of Fighters XV (Dolores)

2023
Sword Art Online: Last Recollection (Dee Eye Ell)

Dubbing

Live-action
Gal Gadot
Batman v Superman: Dawn of Justice (Diana Prince/Wonder Woman)
Triple 9 (Elena Vlaslov)
Wonder Woman (Diana Prince/Wonder Woman)
Justice League (Diana Prince/Wonder Woman)
Between Two Ferns: The Movie (Gal Gadot)
Wonder Woman 1984 (Diana Prince/Wonder Woman)
Zack Snyder's Justice League (Diana Prince/Wonder Woman)
Red Notice (Sarah Black)
Death on the Nile (Linnet Ridgeway-Doyle)
Shazam! Fury of the Gods (Diana Prince/Wonder Woman)
Rachel Weisz
Constantine (Angela Dodson)
Definitely, Maybe (Summer Hartley)
The Lovely Bones (Abigail Salmon)
Dream House (Libby Atenton)
Oz the Great and Powerful (Evanora)
My Cousin Rachel (Rachel Ashley)
Anne Hathaway
The Princess Diaries (Mia Thermopolis)
The Princess Diaries 2: Royal Engagement (Mia Thermopolis)
Brokeback Mountain (Lureen Newsome Twist)
Colossal (Gloria)
Ocean's 8 (Daphne Kluger)
Locked Down (Linda)
Michelle Rodriguez
Fast & Furious (Leticia "Letty" Ortiz)
Fast & Furious 6 (Leticia "Letty" Ortiz)
Furious 7 (Leticia "Letty" Ortiz-Toretto)
The Fate of the Furious (Leticia "Letty" Ortiz-Toretto)
F9 (Letty Ortiz)
Dungeons & Dragons: Honor Among Thieves (Holga the Barbarian)
Gemma Arterton
Clash of the Titans (Io)
Hansel & Gretel: Witch Hunters (Gretel)
The Girl with All the Gifts (Helen Justineau)
Murder Mystery (Grace Ballard)
Blake Lively
Gossip Girl (Serena van der Woodsen)
The Private Lives of Pippa Lee (Young Pippa)
Green Lantern (Carol Ferris)
The Shallows (Nancy Adams)
Emily Blunt
The Young Victoria (Queen Victoria)
The Five-Year Engagement (Violet Barnes)
Looper (Sara)
12 Monkeys (Dr. Cassandra Railly (Amanda Schull))
12 Rounds (Molly Porter (Ashley Scott))
88 Minutes (Lauren Douglas (Leelee Sobieski))
About Time (Charlotte (Margot Robbie))
American Pie Presents: The Naked Mile (Brandy (Candace Kroslak))
American Pie Presents: The Book of Love (Heidi (Beth Behrs))
Amores perros (Susana (Vanessa Bauche))
Anonymous Rex (Louise (Lori Alter))
Antwone Fisher (Cheryl Smolley (Joy Bryant))
Apocalypto (Seven (Dalia Hernández))
Beauty and the Beast (Princesse (Yvonne Catterfeld))
The Blacklist (Elizabeth "Liz" Keen (Megan Boone))
Casablanca (2013 Star Channel edition) (Ilsa Lund (Ingrid Bergman))
Celeste and Jesse Forever (Celeste Martin (Rashida Jones))
Conan the Barbarian (Tamara (Rachel Nichols))
Crimson Peak (Lady Lucille Sharpe (Jessica Chastain))
Crocodile Dundee (Netflix edition) (Sue Charlton (Linda Kozlowski))
The Darkest Hour (Anne (Rachael Taylor))
Deadwater Fell (Kate Kendrick (Anna Madeley))
The Detonator (2009 TV Tokyo edition) (Nadia Cominski (Silvia Colloca))
Devil's Due (Samantha McCall (Allison Miller))
Dick (Betsy Jones (Kirsten Dunst))
Disturbia (Ashley Carlson (Sarah Roemer))
Doctor Strange in the Multiverse of Madness (Clea (Charlize Theron))
Downton Abbey (Lady Mary Crawley (Michelle Dockery))
Dragonball Evolution (Mai (Eriko Tamura))
Drumline (Laila (Zoe Saldana))
Eight Below (Katie (Moon Bloodgood))
Elizabeth: The Golden Age (Bess Throckmorton (Abbie Cornish))
ER (Dr. Neela Rasgotra (Parminder Nagra))
Godzilla: King of the Monsters (Dr. Ilene Chen and Dr. Ling Chen (Zhang Ziyi))
Good Bye, Lenin! (Lara (Chulpan Khamatova))
Halo (Kai-125 (Kate Kennedy))
The Help (Hilly Walters Holbrook (Bryce Dallas Howard))
High Noon (2021 Star Channel edition) (Amy Fowler Kane (Grace Kelly))
The Hitchhiker's Guide to the Galaxy (Trillian (Zooey Deschanel))
The Hobbit: The Desolation of Smaug (Tauriel (Evangeline Lilly))
The Hobbit: The Battle of the Five Armies (Tauriel (Evangeline Lilly))
House of Cards (LeAnn Harvey (Neve Campbell))
Immortals (Phaedra (Freida Pinto))
The Incredible Hulk (Betty Ross (Liv Tyler))
Iron Sky (Renate Richter (Julia Dietze))
The Island (Jordan Two Delta/Sarah Jordan (Scarlett Johansson))
The Jane Austen Book Club (Allegra (Maggie Grace))
Jason Bourne (2022 BS Tokyo edition) (Heather Lee (Alicia Vikander))
Just Mercy (Eva Ansley (Brie Larson))
Lake Placid vs. Anaconda (Tiffani (Laura Dale))
The Last Station (Sasha Tolstoy (Anne-Marie Duff))
The Last Time (Belisa (Amber Valletta))
Le Concert (Anne-Marie Jacquet and Lea Strum (Mélanie Laurent))
Martial Arts of Shaolin (Si-ma Yan)
The Meddler (Lori Minervini (Rose Byrne))
Mission: Impossible – Rogue Nation (Ilsa Faust (Rebecca Ferguson))
Mission: Impossible – Fallout (Ilsa Faust (Rebecca Ferguson))
Monsters (Samantha Wynden (Whitney Able))
Mood Indigo (Chloé (Audrey Tautou))
Mrs. America (Alice Macray (Sarah Paulson))
NCIS: New Orleans (Tammy Gregorio (Vanessa Ferlito))
Nine (Claudia Jenssen (Nicole Kidman))
Pandorum (Nadia (Antje Traue))
Pete's Dragon (Grace Meacham (Bryce Dallas Howard))
Phone Booth (Pamela McFadden (Katie Holmes))
Project ALF (Major Dr. Melissa Hill (Jensen Daggett))
Red Riding Hood (Valerie (Amanda Seyfried))
Return to House on Haunted Hill (Ariel Wolfe (Amanda Righetti))
The Rocker (Amelia Stone (Emma Stone))
RocknRolla (Stella (Thandie Newton))
Rogue (Samantha O'Hara (Megan Fox))
Salvador (Cuca (Leonor Watling))
Scream (Sheriff Judy Hicks (Marley Shelton))
Smallville (Lana Lang (Kristin Kreuk))
The Social Network (Marylin Delpy (Rashida Jones))
Somewhere in Time (2021 BS Tokyo edition) (Elise McKenna (Jane Seymour))
Sucker Punch (Sweet Pea (Abbie Cornish))
Tomb Raider (Lara Croft (Alicia Vikander))
Tron: Legacy (Gem (Beau Garrett))
Vinyl (Devon Finestra (Olivia Wilde))
Watchmen (Silk Spectre II (Malin Åkerman))
The Water Diviner (Ayshe (Olga Kurylenko))
Wicker Park (Lisa Parish (Diane Kruger))
X-Men: First Class (Emma Frost (January Jones))
You Stupid Man (Chloe (Denise Richards))
Zombieland (Wichita (Emma Stone))

Animation
 Arcane (Caitlyn)
 The Bad Guys (Diane Foxington)
 Big Hero 6 (Ringleader)
 Brother Bear 2 (Nita)
 Cloudy with a Chance of Meatballs (Sam Sparks)
 Cloudy with a Chance of Meatballs 2 (Sam Sparks)
 Flushed Away (Rita Malone)
 Megamind (Roxanne Ritchi)
 Planes: Fire & Rescue (Dottie)
 Ratchet & Clank (Elaris)
 RWBY (Cinder Fall)
 Space Jam: A New Legacy (Wonder Woman)
 Spider-Man: Into the Spider-Verse (Mary Jane Watson)

References

External links
 
 
Yūko Kaida at GamePlaza-Haruka Voice Acting Database 
Yūko Kaida at Hitoshi Doi's Seiyuu Database

1980 births
Living people
Japanese stage actresses
Japanese video game actresses
Japanese voice actresses
Ken Production voice actors
Voice actresses from Kanagawa Prefecture
Voice actors from Kawasaki, Kanagawa
21st-century Japanese actresses